List of provinces of Japan > Nankaidō > Iyo Province > Shūfu District

Japan > Shikoku > Ehime Prefecture > Shūfu District

 was a district located in eastern Iyo Province (Ehime Prefecture). In 1897, the district merged with Kuwamura District (桑村郡) to become Shūsō District (周桑郡) and the district dissolved.

Timeline 
 December 15, 1889 - Due to the municipal status enforcement, 10 villages were formed.
 吉井村 ← 石田村, 今在家村, 広江村, 新屋敷村の一部, 玉之江村の一部（壬生川町 → 東予市 → 西条市）
 周布村 ← 吉田村, 周布村の一部, 三津屋村の一部（同上）
 多賀村 ← 北条村, 三津屋村の一部, 周布村の一部（同上）
 小松村 ← 南川村, 北川村, 新屋敷村の一部, 玉之江村の一部（小松町 → 西条市）
 石根村 ← 妙口村, 大頭村, 大郷村, 安井村, 明穂村の一部（同上）
 千足山村 ← 千足山村（石鎚村 → 小松町 → 西条市）
 福岡村 ← 久妙寺村, 今井村, 丹原村, 池田村, 願蓮寺村（丹原町 → 西条市）
 Village of Tano ← 長野村, 田野村上方, 北田野村, 高松村, 川根村（同上）
 中川村 ← 湯屋口村, 志川村, 寺尾村, 来見村, 石経村, 関屋村, 明穂村の一部（同上）
 桜樹村 ← 楠窪村, 滑川村, 明河村, 鞍瀬村, 千原村, 臼坂村（中川村 → 丹原町 → 西条市，滑川村・明河村は 中川村 → 川内町 → 東温市）
 April 1, 1897 - Merged with Kuwamura District to become Shūsō District.

Former districts of Ehime Prefecture